Crowne is an English surname. Notable people with the surname include:

John Crowne (1641–1712), British dramatist, son of William
William Crowne (1617–1682), English officer of arms, politician, and colonel

See also
Crowne Plaza

English-language surnames